Edward Lee Turner (born November 20, 1957) is an American basketball player who played for three years at Texas A&I University (now Texas A&M University–Kingsville), where he averaged 22.9 points, 12.8 rebounds, and 5.9 assists per game for his career. He was drafted by the Houston Rockets in the second round of the 1981 NBA Draft, but he did not play in the NBA.

References

Profile —TheDraftReview.com

1957 births
Living people
American men's basketball players
Houston Rockets draft picks
Indian River State Pioneers men's basketball players
Small forwards
Basketball players from Buffalo, New York
Texas A&M–Kingsville Javelinas men's basketball players